Carl Otto Svae (4 April 1918 – 30 June 1977) was a Norwegian sailor born in Kristiania. He competed at the 1960 Summer Olympics in Rome, coming fourth in the Dragon class, together with Øivind Christensen and Arild Amundsen.

References

External links

1918 births
1977 deaths
Sportspeople from Oslo
Norwegian male sailors (sport)
Olympic sailors of Norway
Sailors at the 1956 Summer Olympics – Dragon
Sailors at the 1960 Summer Olympics – Dragon